"Rhinestone World" is a song recorded by Canadian country music singer Dallas Smith. The song was released to radio by 604 Records as the second single from his 2019 EP The Fall, as well as his 2020 album Timeless. It was also sent to American country radio in 2019 by TTA Music.

Background
The song was written by Rodney Clawson, Andrew DeRoberts, and Josh Osborne. The narrator sings of how he was "lost on highway, a little dazed and confused" before finding a girl, singing to her that "loving you is like finding a diamond in a rhinestone world".

Critical reception
Nanci Dagg of Canadian Beats Media stated the track "is a happy song that is full of metaphors and if even one of those metaphors describes the love you feel for someone, this song will resonate with you". Front Porch Music remarked that the track "features the rock influence we love in a country song from Dallas Smith" and "is a tribute to unconditional, romantic love".

Music video
The music video for "Rhinestone World" premiered February 15, 2019.

Chart performance
"Rhinestone World" reached a peak of Number One on the Billboard Canada Country chart dated March 16, 2019. It became Smith's sixth-consecutive Number One hit on the chart, and seventh overall, extending his records for the most by any Canadian country artist.

Charts

References

2018 songs
2018 singles
Dallas Smith songs
604 Records singles
Songs written by Rodney Clawson
Songs written by Josh Osborne
Song recordings produced by Joey Moi